Charles Tottenham Loftus, 1st Marquess of Ely, KP, PC (23 January 1738 – 22 March 1806) was an Anglo-Irish peer and politician.

Life 
Born Charles Tottenham, he assumed the additional surname of Loftus in 1783, after inheriting the estates of his uncle Henry Loftus, 1st Earl of Ely. He was the only son of Sir John Tottenham, 1st Baronet of Loftus Hall, County Wexford, (died 1786), by Henry Loftus' sister Elizabeth (died 1747).

He represented Fethard (County Wexford) in the Irish House of Commons from 1776 to 1783. In the latter year, he stood as Member of Parliament for Wexford Borough, a seat he held until 1785, when he was raised to the Peerage of Ireland as Baron Loftus of Loftus Hall, County Wexford. From 14 January 1789 until 1806 Loftus was one of the joint Postmasters General of Ireland. In 1789 he was furthered honoured with the title Viscount Loftus and in 1794 he was made Earl of Ely. He became Marquess of Ely on 29 December 1800 and was appointed a Knight of the Order of St Patrick on 12 December 1794. In 1801 he was made Baron Loftus of Long Loftus, Yorkshire in the Peerage of the United Kingdom, which entitled him and his successors to a seat in the House of Lords.

He married in 1766 Jane Myhill (died 1807), daughter of Robert Myhill, of Killarney, Co. Kilkenny, and Mary Billingsley, and had two sons, John, his heir, and Robert, Bishop of Clogher.

References

External links

|-

|-

|-

1738 births
1806 deaths
18th-century Anglo-Irish people
Loftus, Charles
Loftus, Charles
Knights of St Patrick
Loftus, Charles
Members of the Privy Council of Ireland
Charles
Marquesses of Ely
Peers of Ireland created by George III
Peers of the United Kingdom created by George III
Postmasters General of Ireland